Valeria Bhunu (born 3 April 1995) is a Zimbabwean tennis player.

Bhunu has won two singles titles on the ITF Circuit. On 14 November 2016, she reached her best singles ranking of world No. 497. On 21 November 2016, she peaked at No. 534 in the doubles rankings.

In 2015, she played for Zimbabwe in the 2015 African Games in Brazzaville, Republic of the Congo where she won the bronze medal in women's singles and doubles.

In 2022, Bhunu was given a three years and three months suspension for anti-doping rules violations.

ITF Circuit finals

Singles: 6 (2 titles, 4 runner-ups)

Doubles: 5 (5 runner-ups)

References

External links
 

1995 births
Zimbabwean female tennis players
Living people
African Games bronze medalists for Zimbabwe
African Games medalists in tennis
Competitors at the 2015 African Games
Doping cases in tennis